Alain Ferry (17 December 1939, Bône in French Algeria) is a French professor and writer, recipient of the 2009 edition of the prix Médicis essai for his novel Mémoire d'un fou d'Emma, drawn from Madame Bovary by Gustave Flaubert.

Bibliography 
1978: El-Kous : éthopée d'un pied-noir, tale, Paris, Éditions du Seuil
1983: Le Devoir de rédaction, novel, Arles, Actes Sud
1995: La Mer des mamelles : roman d'amour ès-lettres avec des post-scriptum, Paris, Le Seuil
2009: Mémoire d'un fou d'Emma, essay, Le Seuil
2013: Rhapsodie pour un librique défunt, novel, Rennes, Éditions Apogée
2014: Le Livre de Marie-Anne, novel, Éditions des Équateurs
2014: Le Fils d’Étienne, novel, Rennes, Apogée

20th-century French non-fiction writers
Prix Médicis essai winners
People from Annaba
1939 births
Living people